Hira Thind is a Punjabi singer and theatre actor. He is best known for his songs like Speciality and Mere Jinna Pyaar. He is also known for his works in theatre.

Early life 
Thind was born and brought up in Powayan, Shahjahanpur district in Uttar Pradesh. He completed his education in Powayan.

Career 
In 2014, Thind started his career as a theatre actor. He played characters in various plays and composed music also. During theatre days his interest increased towards singing and In 2018, He moved to Punjab for his music education. He learned singing skills from Ustad Baldeep Singh Balli and Ustad Harvinder Bittu. In 2020, he moved to Chandigarh and released his debut song "Mere Jinna Pyaar". In 2021, he released song "Speciality" and gained recognition in Punjabi music Industry.

Discography

Singles

As an actor plays 
Virasat
Dara-Sikoh
Spartacus

As a music composer plays 
Ek Prayas
Dara-Sikoh
Katha Ek Kans Ki
Spartacus
Andha-Yug

References 

21st-century Indian male singers
21st-century Indian singers
Punjabi-language singers
Living people
1999 births
People from Shahjahanpur district
Indian stage actors
Singers from Uttar Pradesh